Kingsville is a semi-rural, unincorporated community and census-designated place in Baltimore County, Maryland, United States. It is a close-knit and rustic community bounded by the Little Gunpowder Falls river (to the northeast) and the Big Gunpowder Falls river (to the southwest) which join to form the Gunpowder River. The population of Kingsville was 4,318 at the 2010 census.

History
Kingsville takes its name from Abraham King (1760–1836), who died there on December 15 at the age of 76. King lived in the old Hugh Deane-John Paul mansion (later known as the Kingsville Inn and presently as the Lassahn Funeral home on Belair Road) with his wife Elizabeth Taylor, a sister of the Hon. John Taylor of Willistown, who settled in the West and was the Chief Judge of the Superior Court of Mississippi for a number of years. An 1823 assessment of Old District 2 showed "Abraham King with 290 acres of 'William the Conqueror' and $350 worth of improvements, no slaves."

The King family operated a tavern according to an 1847 advertisement in American Farmer (a pioneer agricultural journal) at the forks of Bel Air and Joppa (presumably present day Jerusalem) roads. U.S. postal records indicate that a post office was established at King's Tavern on January 29, 1829, with a George King noted as the postmaster; the office was named "Kingsville" on January 8, 1830. In 1840, State Geologist John Henry Alexander was the first to put Kingsville on a map.

Kingsville is bordered by the restored Jerusalem Mill Village museum, Jericho Farm, and the renovated Jericho Covered Bridge on the banks of the Little Gunpowder Falls.  They are listed on the National Register of Historic Places.

Other nearby communities include Upper Falls, Bradshaw, Franklinville, Joppa, Fork and Perry Hall.

Geography
Kingsville is located at  (39.449257, −76.413933).

Demographics

As of the census of 2000, there were 4,214 people, 1,483 households, and 1,224 families residing in the CDP. The racial makeup of the CDP was 97.41% White, 0.36% African American, 0.31% Native American, 0.97% Asian, 0.24% from other races, and 0.71% from two or more races. Hispanic or Latino of any race were 0.85% of the population.

There were 1,483 households, out of which 35.5% had children under the age of 18 living with them, 73.6% were married couples living together, 6.1% had a female householder with no husband present, and 17.4% were non-families. 13.9% of all households were made up of individuals, and 7.3% had someone living alone who was 65 years of age or older. The average household size was 2.84 and the average family size was 3.14.

In the CDP, the population was spread out, with 24.4% under the age of 18, 6.1% from 18 to 24, 24.8% from 25 to 44, 29.8% from 45 to 64, and 14.9% who were 65 years of age or older. The median age was 42 years. For every 100 females, there were 97.1 males. For every 100 females age 18 and over, there were 95.0 males.

The median income for a household in the CDP was $78,025, and the median income for a family was $87,071. Males had a median income of $52,140 versus $31,438 for females. The per capita income for the CDP was $34,579. About 2.6% of families and 2.6% of the population were below the poverty line, including 0.5% of those under age 18 and 7.4% of those age 65 or over.

Notable people
 Charles Joseph Bonaparte (1851-1921), U.S. Secretary of the Navy and Attorney General
 Ishmael Day, early resident
 Dave Johnson, former MLB pitcher
 Tom Phoebus, former MLB pitcher
 Blaze Starr, former burlesque star
 William Purington Cole Jr. - US Congressman 1927-29, 31-38; President Board of Trustees of University of Maryland; resided at Beachmont Farm, then known as Clearview Farm.

References

External links

 Historic sites in the Greater Kingsville area
 Jerusalem Covered Bridge (not to be confused with Jericho Covered Bridge)
 Historic Jerusalem Mill Village
 Kingsville Independence Day Parade
 Former Nike Missile Launch Site (BA-09)
 Former Nike Missile Firing Control Site
 History of the Kingsville Volunteer Fire Company
 Kingsville Elementary School
 Kingsville Recreation Council

Census-designated places in Baltimore County, Maryland
Census-designated places in Maryland